William Armiger Sealy Lewis (1851 – March 19, 1931), known professionally as Lewis Sealy, was an Irish actor and a film exhibitor.

Career 
Sealy was a character actor. A native of Ireland, he worked on the London stage for years. He co-wrote and performed in the play A Heathen Goddess at the West London Theatre in 1894.

In the 1890s, he was a film exhibitor, known for the "Royal Cinematoscope", which was the name under which he exhibited Birt Acres' Kineopticon. 

He first came to New York in 1908, working as a stage manager and occasional actor as he had in London. His first play in New York was Captain Brassbound's Conversion. He had been a stage director for Lily Langtry and Olga Nethersole.

Having left family in Ireland and England, he apparently returned to work as a stage actor in London, before travelling once more to New York around 1915 to begin a career in film.

His film career included appearances in a number of silent features, in The Witching Hour (1916). A Variety review noted that Sealy "brought a dignity commensurate with the role".

Death 
He died on March 19, 1931. He was survived by a daughter and two sons. He was buried at Kensico Cemetery in Valhalla, New York.

In popular culture 
Sealy was portrayed by Sean O'Bryan in Chaplin (1992).

Stage work

London 
As a stage manager:
 As You Like It (St James' Theatre; February 24, 1890 - April 30, 1890)
 Esther Sandraz (St James' Theatre; May 3, 1890 - June 7, 1890)
 Your Wife (St James' Theatre; June 26, 1890 - July 7, 1890)
 Miss Hoyden's Husband (Shaftesbury Theatre; July 4, 1890)
As an actor:
 A Heathen Goddess (also co-writer; West London Theatre; October 12, 1894)
 The Man in the Iron Mask (The Adelphi, March 11, 1899 - May 20, 1899) as Officer 
 The Chetwynd Affair (Royalty Theatre; August 29, 1904 - September 24, 1904)
 The Merchant of Venice (Terry's Theatre; March 9, 1905 - March 11, 1905) 
 Fanny's First Play  (Little Theatre April April 19, 1911 - December 29, 1911; Kingsway Theatre December 30, 1911 December 20, 1912) as Cecil Savoyard
 John Bull's Other Island (Kingsway Theatre, December 26, 1912 - March 1, 1913) as Corney Doyle

Broadway 

 Margaret Schiller (January 31, 1916 – Closing date unknown)
 The Fountain of Youth (April 1, 1918 – April 1918)
 A Marriage of Convenience (May 1, 1918 – June 1918)
 King Richard III (March 6, 1920 – March 1920) as Lord Hastings
 The Awful Truth (September 18, 1922 – January 20, 1923) as Jayson
 Merry Wives of Gotham (January 16, 1924 – April 1924) as Pomeroy
 Lass O'Laughter (January 8, 1925 – February 1925) as Richards
 The Merchant of Venice (January 16, 1928 – March 1928) as Balthasar
 Dishonored Lady (February 4, 1930 – May 1930) as Sims

Filmography 

 Barbara Frietchie (1915) as Judge Frietchie
 The Unborn (1916) as Mr. Worthy
 The Witching Hour (1916) as Justice George Prentice
 The Primitive Call (1917) as John Malcolm
 Draft 258 (1917) (credited as Lewis Sealey)
 His House in Order (1920)
 The Fatal Hour (1920) as Felix (credited as Louis Sealey)
 A Virgin Paradise (1921) as Peter Latham (credited as Lewis Seeley)

References

External links 

 
 
 
 Lewis Sealy at Who's Who of Victorian Cinema

1851 births
1931 deaths
Irish emigrants to the United States (before 1923)
Irish film actors
Burials at Kensico Cemetery